Tarek El Shinnawi (sometimes spelled El Shennawi or Shennawy) is an internationally recognised and renowned film critic and writer of Arab cinema. He is one of the most influential film critics of Arab cinema in the region, based in Cairo, Egypt. he writes in most of the top Arabic newspapers, magazines and websites for more than 30 years, he has more than 15 published books on Arab cinema various subjects. He also teaches the subject of film critique to the students in the final years of The Cairo university, faculty of Mass-communication. He has numerous cinematic participations in arbitration committees of International and Arab festivals. He has been frequently appointed as a jury member in Arab film festivals  (as in the 12th Osian's-Cinefan Film Festival 2012, 9th Dubai International Film Festival 2012, 8th Abu Dhabi Film Festival 2014).

He has made calls for reform of the old-fashioned censorship regulations that disallow cinema and TV to impersonate the prophets.  These regulations were made in 1926 when Youssef Wahbi desired to make a film depicting prophet Muhammad which was disallowed by Al-Azhar.

See also
Lists of Egyptians

References

External links 
 أبو النجا: صائد الجوائز

Egyptian film critics
Living people
Year of birth missing (living people)